On May 4, 1841, a special election was held in  to fill a vacancy caused by the death of William S. Ramsey (D) on October 17, 1840, shortly after his re-election, and before the 26th Congress had ended.

Election results

Gustine took his seat on May 31, at the start of the 1st session of the 27th Congress.

See also
List of special elections to the United States House of Representatives
 United States House of Representatives elections, 1840

References

Pennsylvania 1841 13
Pennsylvania 1841 13
1841 13
Pennsylvania 13
United States House of Representatives 13
United States House of Representatives 1841 13